Wilson Township, Arkansas may refer to:

 Wilson Township, Clay County, Arkansas
 Wilson Township, Faulkner County, Arkansas
 Wilson Township, Fulton County, Arkansas
 Wilson Township, Pope County, Arkansas
 Wilson Township, Stone County, Arkansas

See also 
 List of townships in Arkansas
 Wilson Township (disambiguation)

Arkansas township disambiguation pages